Fritz Streletz (born 28 September 1926) is a German former army general of the GDR.

In 1944 he entered the Wehrmacht as a noncommissioned officer after graduating from military school in Deggendorf. He was captured by Soviet forces in February 1945 and released in October 1948, whereupon he joined the Volkspolizei. In 1956 he joined the precursor to the National People's Army, the Kasernierte Volkspolizei, as an officer.

In 1991, after the re-unification of Germany, Streletz was arrested. He was charged in February 1992 for the incitement to kill German civilians fleeing East Germany and was found guilty. He was sentenced to five years and six months in prison but was released in October 1997.

Streletz remained committed to the GDR's ideals after re-unification.

References

1926 births
Living people
Colonel generals of the National People's Army (Ground Forces)
German Army soldiers of World War II
German prisoners of war in World War II held by the Soviet Union